Leichhardt Espresso Chorus is Sydney’s contemporary choir, specialising in Australian art music for choir and orchestra. The choir has participated in the world premiere of 200 new compositions since 2002, having commissioned (or co-commissioned) 170 of these. Since its inception in 1998, LEC has prospered under the leadership of Artistic Director Michelle Leonard and has redefined the capacity of community choirs.  They have collaborated with many other performers, such as Edinburgh Military Tattoo, and are the artist-in-residence at the Moorambilla Festival in New South Wales.  In 2008 the chorus received the "Best Community Outreach" award in the inaugural Music in Communities Awards by the Music Council of Australia.

Background
Based in Sydney's inner-west Leichhardt Municipality, the choir comprises over 80 singers, and performs three major concerts a year.  Under the artistic direction of conductor Michelle Leonard OAM, the choir strives to stretch the boundaries of excellence in community music but does not restrict membership through auditions. LEC promotes choral music in its community, which includes strong links with western NSW and a tradition of mentoring children's choirs through joint projects. LEC also fosters new Australian choral music by commissioning local composers to produce new works and new arrangements of classics for particular events.

LEC collaborates with Australian soloists in producing its major concerts. Recent soloists include Craig Everingham (baritone), Paul Goodchild (trumpet), Simon Halligan (baritone), Christina Leonard (soprano saxophone), Billie McCarthy (vocalist), Nadia Piave (vocalist), Jane Sheldon (soprano), Dan Walker (tenor), Sally Whitwell (piano) and Narelle Yeo (soprano).

Significant recent collaborations with professional arts groups include:
2010: Edinburgh Military Tattoo in Sydney and broadcast on FOX TV;
2009: Love, Lust and Longing radio broadcast on the Australian Broadcasting Corporation’s Sunday Live;
2007: Stomp, (supporting the Lost and Found Orchestra), Sydney Festival;
2007: Singing the Space, official opening of the Performance Space, Carriageworks; and
2007: Lulie the Iceberg, with Kageboushi Theatre Company, Sydney Theatre Company.

Each December, LEC produces Carols on Norton, a free community Christmas concert staged in Pioneers Memorial Park, Leichhardt.

LEC also features Ristretto, a chamber choir.

Awards
2006: New South Wales runner-up, ABC Classic FM Choir of the Year Award
2008: "Best Community Outreach", Music in Communities Awards, Music Council of Australia

Commissioned works
The Leichhardt Express Chorus is committed to the development of new Australian choral music. This involves commissioning new music and updated arrangements of classics for particular events (such as re-workings of traditional carols for the Carols on Norton Concerts).

Between 2002 and 2011 the choir commissioned or co-commissioned 53 new songs (as listed below) and 23 new arrangements (indicated by + in the list below). As part of its role as choir-in-residence at the annual Moorambilla Festival, LEC has also participated in the premiere of an additional 14 new songs and 1 new arrangement that were commissioned for that Festival.

+ A new arrangement of an existing work

Additional world premiere works
, LEC has participated in the world premier of 91 new compositions. In addition to the 76 listed in the table above, the choir participated in the world premiere performance of a further 15 works that were commissioned for the Moorambilla Festival. These are listed in the following table.

+ A new arrangement of an existing work

References

 Music in Communities Award 2008 – Winners Stories: Best Community Outreach award: https://web.archive.org/web/20100818062924/http://musicincommunities.org.au/blog/2008/12/music-in-communities-awards-2008-winners-stories/#more-94
 ABC Classic FM Choir of the Year Award
 Michelle Leonard interviewed by the Music in Communities Network 
 Australian Stage review of the Lost and Found Orchestra performance, Sydney Festival 2007
 Artreach article, December 2005

External links
 
 Moorambilla Festival

Australian choirs
Musical groups established in 1998